This is a list of 401 species in Mycomya, a genus of fungus gnats in the family Mycetophilidae.

Mycomya species

 Mycomya abegena Vaisanen, 1984 i c g
 Mycomya accrescens Vaisanen, 1984 i c g
 Mycomya aequa Plassmann, 1987 c g
 Mycomya aestiva (Wulp, 1877) c g
 Mycomya affinis Staeger, 1840 i c
 Mycomya alexanderi Coher, 1950 c g
 Mycomya alluaudi Edwards, 1914 c g
 Mycomya alpina Matile, 1972 c g
 Mycomya altaica Vaisanen, 1984 c g
 Mycomya alticola  g
 Mycomya aluco Vaisanen, 1984 i c g
 Mycomya amgulata (Adams, 1903) i c g
 Mycomya amica Vaisanen, 1984 i c g
 Mycomya ampla Garrett, 1924 i c g
 Mycomya amurensis Vaisanen, 1984 c g
 Mycomya andreinii (Bezzi, 1906) c g
 Mycomya aneura Vaisanen, 1984 i c g
 Mycomya anneliae Vaisanen, 1996 c g
 Mycomya annulata (Meigen, 1818) c g
 Mycomya ansata Freeman, 1951 c g
 Mycomya aonyx  g
 Mycomya apoensis  g
 Mycomya arcuata Vaisanen, 1984 i c g
 Mycomya arethusa Coher, 1952 c g
 Mycomya arnaudi Vaisanen, 1984 i c g
 Mycomya ata Garrett, 1924 i c g
 Mycomya aureola Wu, 1995 c g
 Mycomya austrobliqua Coher, 1959 c g
 Mycomya autumnalis Garrett, 1924 i c g
 Mycomya avala Vaisanen, 1984 c g
 Mycomya banteng  g
 Mycomya baotianmana Wu, Zheng & Xu, 2001 c g
 Mycomya basinerva Freeman, 1951 c g
 Mycomya bequaerti Coher, 1950 c g
 Mycomya bialorussica Landrock, 1925 g
 Mycomya bialourssica (Landrock, 1925) c g
 Mycomya bicolor (Dziedzicki, 1885) i c g
 Mycomya bifida Freeman, 1951 c g
 Mycomya binturong Vaisanen, 1996 c g
 Mycomya biseriata (Loew, 1869) i c g
 Mycomya bisulca (Lackschewitz, 1937) c g
 Mycomya boracensis Coher, 1959 c g
 Mycomya borinquensis Coher, 1959 c g
 Mycomya bowiei Omad, Pessacq & Anjos-Santos, 2017 g
 Mycomya branderi Vaisanen, 1984 c g
 Mycomya brevifurcata Enderlein, 1910 c g
 Mycomya breviseta Vaisanen, 1984 c g
 Mycomya britteni Kidd, 1955 g
 Mycomya brontes Coher, 1952 c g
 Mycomya brunnea (Dziedzicki, 1885) c g
 Mycomya bryanti Vaisanen, 1984 i c g
 Mycomya byersi Vaisanen, 1984 i c g
 Mycomya calcarata (Coquillett, 1904) i c g
 Mycomya campestra Coher, 1959 c g
 Mycomya canariornata Chandler & Ribeiro, 1995 c g
 Mycomya canoak Vaisanen, 1984 i c g
 Mycomya capra Vaisanen, 1996 c g
 Mycomya carpinea Plassmann & Vogel, 1990 c g
 Mycomya carrerai Coher, 1950 c g
 Mycomya chemodanensis Maximova, 2001 c g
 Mycomya chilensis Blanchard, 1852 c g
 Mycomya chloratica Johannsen, 1910 c g
 Mycomya cinerascens (Macquart, 1826) i c g
 Mycomya cingulata (Meigen, 1804) c g
 Mycomya circumdata (Staeger, 1840) c g
 Mycomya cissa  g
 Mycomya citrina Shaw, 1940 c g
 Mycomya clavata (Lynch Arribalzaga, 1892) c g
 Mycomya clavicera (Lundstrom, 1912) c g
 Mycomya cleta Coher, 1952 c g
 Mycomya coeles Chandler, 1994 c g
 Mycomya collini (Edwards, 1941) c g
 Mycomya comesa Vaisanen, 1984 i c g
 Mycomya confusa Vaisanen, 1979 c g
 Mycomya connecta Coher, 1959 c g
 Mycomya corcyrensis (Lundstrom, 1912) c g
 Mycomya coxalis Freeman, 1951 c g
 Mycomya cramptoni Coher, 1950 c g
 Mycomya cranbrooki Garrett, 1924 i c g
 Mycomya cuon  g
 Mycomya curvata (Fisher, 1937) c g
 Mycomya curvilinea Brunetti, 1912 c g
 Mycomya cylindrica Freeman, 1951 c g
 Mycomya danielae Matile, 1972 i c g
 Mycomya decorosa (Winnertz, 1863) c g
 Mycomya denmax Vaisanen, 1979 i c g
 Mycomya dentata Fisher, 1937 i c g
 Mycomya dichaeta Fisher, 1937 i c g b
 Mycomya dictyophila Wu, Zheng & Xu, 2001 c g
 Mycomya difficilis Garrett, 1924 i c g
 Mycomya digitifera (Edwards, 1925) c g
 Mycomya dilatata (Ostroverkhova, 1979) c g
 Mycomya diluta (Zetterstedt, 1860) c g
 Mycomya disa Vaisanen, 1984 c g
 Mycomya divisa Freeman, 1951 c g
 Mycomya dorsimacula Enderlein, 1910 c g
 Mycomya dryope Coher, 1952 c g
 Mycomya dryophila (Ostroverkhova, 1979) c g
 Mycomya ducula  g
 Mycomya dumeta Coher, 1959 c g
 Mycomya duplicata (Edwards, 1925) c g
 Mycomya dura Garrett, 1924 i c g
 Mycomya dziedzicki Vaisanen, 1981 c g
 Mycomya echinata Garrett, 1924 i c g
 Mycomya edra Vaisanen, 1994 c g
 Mycomya edwardsi Coher, 1950 c g
 Mycomya egregia (Dziedzicki, 1885) c g
 Mycomya electa Vaisanen, 1984 i c g
 Mycomya elephas Vaisanen, 1984 i c g
 Mycomya emotoi Vaisanen, 1996 c g
 Mycomya epacra Coher, 1959 c g
 Mycomya esox Vaisanen, 1984 i c g
 Mycomya excerpta Coher, 1959 c g
 Mycomya exigua (Winnertz, 1863) c g
 Mycomya falcifera Freeman, 1951 c g
 Mycomya fasciata Zetterstedt i c g
 Mycomya fasriata (Zetterstedt, 1838) i c g
 Mycomya fenestralis (Philippi, 1865) c g
 Mycomya fennica Vaisanen, 1979 c g
 Mycomya ferruginea (Meigen, 1818) c g
 Mycomya ferrzai Coher, 1950 c g
 Mycomya festivalis Vaisanen, 1984 c g
 Mycomya fimbriata (Meigen, 1818) i c g
 Mycomya fissa (Lundstrom, 1911) c g
 Mycomya flabellata (Lackschewitz, 1937) c g
 Mycomya flava (Winnertz, 1863) c g
 Mycomya flavescens Freeman, 1951 c g
 Mycomya flavicollis (Zetterstedt, 1852) c g
 Mycomya flavilatera Tonnoir & Edwards, 1927 c g
 Mycomya flaviventris Brunetti, 1912 c g
 Mycomya forcipata Freeman, 1951 c g
 Mycomya forestaria (Plassmann, 1978) c g
 Mycomya fornicata (Lundstrom, 1911) c g
 Mycomya fragilis (Loew, 1869) i c g
 Mycomya freemani Coher, 1950 c g
 Mycomya frequens Johannsen, 1910 i c g
 Mycomya frigida (Plassmann, 1978) c g
 Mycomya funebris Freeman, 1951 c g
 Mycomya furcata Tonnoir & Edwards, 1927 c g
 Mycomya fusca (Meigen, 1818) c g
 Mycomya fuscata Winnertz i c g
 Mycomya fuscicornis Freeman, 1951 c g
 Mycomya fuscipalpis Van Duzee, 1928 i c g
 Mycomya galeapectinata Chandler, 1994 c g
 Mycomya ganglioneuse Wu, Zheng & Xu, 2001 c g
 Mycomya geei Vaisanen, 1996 c g
 Mycomya gimmerthali (Landrock, 1925) c g
 Mycomya goethalsi Vaisanen, 1981 c g
 Mycomya goral  g
 Mycomya griseovittata (Zetterstedt, 1852) c g
 Mycomya guandiana Wu & Yang, 1995 c g
 Mycomya gutianshana Wu & Yang, 1994 c g
 Mycomya hackmani Vaisanen, 1984 c g
 Mycomya hamadryas Coher, 1952 c g
 Mycomya hansoni Coher, 1950 c g
 Mycomya hebrardi (Vaisanen & Matile, 1980) c g
 Mycomya helobia (Ostroverkhova, 1979) c g
 Mycomya hengshana Wu & Yang, 1995 c g
 Mycomya heydeni (Plassmann, 1970) c g
 Mycomya hians (Lundstrom, 1912) c g
 Mycomya hiisi Vaisanen, 1979 c g
 Mycomya himiti (Vanschuytbroeck, 1965) c g
 Mycomya hirticollis (Say, 1824) i c g
 Mycomya humeralis (Skuse, 1890) c g
 Mycomya humida Garrett, 1924 i c g
 Mycomya hyalinata (Meigen, 1830) c g
 Mycomya hystrix Vaisanen, 1996 c g
 Mycomya ibex Vaisanen, 1996 c g
 Mycomya ikar Vaisanen, 1996 c g
 Mycomya imitans Johannsen, 1910 i c g b
 Mycomya imperatrix Vaisanen, 1984 i c g
 Mycomya incerta (Brunetti, 1912) c
 Mycomya incisurata (Zetterstedt, 1838) c g
 Mycomya indefinita Brunetti, 1912 c g
 Mycomya indica Brunetti, 1912 c g
 Mycomya indistincta Polevoi, 1995 c g
 Mycomya inflata (Ostroverkhova, 1979) c g
 Mycomya infuscata Freeman, 1951 c g
 Mycomya insulana Vaisanen, 1984 c g
 Mycomya intermissa (Plassmann, 1984) c g
 Mycomya interposita (Ostroverkhova, 1979) c g
 Mycomya iphis Coher, 1952 c g
 Mycomya irena  g
 Mycomya irene Coher, 1952 c g
 Mycomya islandica Vaisanen, 1984 i c g
 Mycomya jaffuelensis Freeman, 1951 c g
 Mycomya jeti  g
 Mycomya kaa  g
 Mycomya kambaitiensis  g
 Mycomya karelica Vaisanen, 1979 c g
 Mycomya kaurii Vaisanen, 1984 i c g
 Mycomya ketupa Vaisanen, 1996 c g
 Mycomya kiamichii Shaw, 1940 i c g
 Mycomya kiboensis Lindner, 1958 c g
 Mycomya kingi (Edwards, 1941) c g
 Mycomya klossi Edwards, 1931 c g
 Mycomya kurildisa Vaisanen, 1984 c g
 Mycomya kuusamoensis Vaisanen, 1979 c g
 Mycomya kyan Vaisanen, 1996 c g
 Mycomya lambi Edwards, 1941 i c g
 Mycomya lamellata Freeman, 1951 c g
 Mycomya lanei Coher, 1950 c g
 Mycomya lenticulata (Ostroverkhova, 1979) c g
 Mycomya leporina Vaisanen, 1984 i c g
 Mycomya levis Dziedzicki i c g
 Mycomya libentia Plassmann & Vogel, 1990 c g
 Mycomya lightfooti Edwards, 1925 c g
 Mycomya lindrothi (Plassmann, 1981) c g
 Mycomya littoralis (Say, 1824) i c g
 Mycomya livida (Dziedzicki, 1885) c g
 Mycomya lividella Vaisanen, 1984 i c g
 Mycomya londti Vaisanen, 1994 c g
 Mycomya longdeana Wu & Yang, 1994 c g
 Mycomya longistila Freeman, 1951 c g
 Mycomya lutea Enderlein, 1910 c g
 Mycomya lutealis Vaisanen, 1984 i c g
 Mycomya macaca Vaisanen, 1996 c g
 Mycomya macateei Vaisanen, 1984 i c g
 Mycomya maccoyi (Skuse, 1890) c g
 Mycomya maculata (Meigen, 1804) i c g
 Mycomya magna Wu & Yang, 1993 c g
 Mycomya magnifica Vaisanen, 1984 i c g
 Mycomya malaisei Vaisanen, 1996 c g
 Mycomya malkini Vaisanen, 1983 c g
 Mycomya malvinensis Vogel & Plassmann, 1985 c g
 Mycomya manis Vaisanen, 1996 c g
 Mycomya manteri Coher, 1950 c g
 Mycomya maoershana Wu & Yang, 1994 c g
 Mycomya marginalis Johannsen, 1910 i c g
 Mycomya marginata (Meigen, 1818) c g
 Mycomya marmota  g
 Mycomya mathesoni Coher, 1950 c g
 Mycomya matilei Vaisanen, 1984 c g
 Mycomya matrona Vaisanen, 1984 i c g
 Mycomya maura (Walker, 1856) c g
 Mycomya melania (Winnertz, 1863) c g
 Mycomya melanoceras (Edwards, 1925) c g
 Mycomya melanogaster (Zetterstedt, 1852) c g
 Mycomya mendax Johannsen, 1910 i c g
 Mycomya meridionalis Johannsen, 1909 c g
 Mycomya midas Coher, 1952 c g
 Mycomya midea Vaisanen, 1984 i c g
 Mycomya minla Vaisanen, 1996 c g
 Mycomya minuscula Matile, 1991 c g
 Mycomya minutata Edwards, 1931 c g
 Mycomya mituda Vaisanen, 1980 c g
 Mycomya monosta Vaisanen, 1984 i c g
 Mycomya montalba Vaisanen, 1984 i c g
 Mycomya montforti Chandler, 1994 c g
 Mycomya multiseta Coher, 1959 c g
 Mycomya munda (Winnertz, 1863) c g
 Mycomya muscovita Vaisanen, 1984 i c g
 Mycomya mutabilis Sherman, 1921 i c g
 Mycomya naja  g
 Mycomya nakanishii  g
 Mycomya natalensis Vaisanen, 1994 c g
 Mycomya nava (Plassmann, 1977) c g
 Mycomya neimongana Wu, 1991 c g
 Mycomya neodentata Vaisanen, 1984 c g
 Mycomya neohyalinata Vaisanen, 1984 i c g
 Mycomya neolittoralis Vaisanen, 1984 i c g
 Mycomya nicothoe Coher, 1952 c g
 Mycomya nigricauda (Adams, 1903) i c g
 Mycomya nigriceps (Loew, 1873) c g
 Mycomya nigricornis Zetterstedt, 1852 i c g
 Mycomya nipalensis Vaisanen, 1996 c g
 Mycomya nitida (Zetterstedt, 1852) i c g
 Mycomya noctivaga (Plassmann, 1972) c g
 Mycomya norna Vaisanen, 1984 c g
 Mycomya notabilis (Staeger, 1840) c g
 Mycomya notata (Zetterstedt, 1860) c g
 Mycomya novagallica Vaisanen, 1984 i c g
 Mycomya obliqua (Say, 1824) i c g
 Mycomya occultans (Winnertz, 1863) c g
 Mycomya ochracea Freeman, 1951 c g
 Mycomya onusta (Loew, 1969) i c g
 Mycomya oreades Vaisanen, 1984 i c g
 Mycomya ornata Meigen i c g
 Mycomya ostensackeni (Vaisanen, 1984) i c g
 Mycomya paguma  g
 Mycomya pallens (Loew, 1873) c g
 Mycomya pallida (Winnertz, 1863) c g
 Mycomya panthera  g
 Mycomya par (Walker, 1856) c g
 Mycomya paradentata Vaisanen, 1984 c g
 Mycomya paradisa Wu, 1995 c g
 Mycomya paraklossi  g
 Mycomya parva (Dziedzicki, 1885) c g
 Mycomya paupercula Coher, 1959 c g
 Mycomya pectinata Freeman, 1951 c g
 Mycomya pectinifera (Edwards, 1925) c g
 Mycomya penicillata (Dziedzicki, 1885) c g
 Mycomya permixta Vaisanen, 1984 c g
 Mycomya perparva Matile, 1991 c g
 Mycomya peruviana Edwards, 1931 c g
 Mycomya pictithorax (Skuse, 1890) c g
 Mycomya pini Vaisanen, 1984 i c g
 Mycomya pitta  g
 Mycomya plagiata (Tonnoir & Edwards, 1927) c g
 Mycomya polleni Garrett, 1924 i c g
 Mycomya pongo  g
 Mycomya pontis Coher, 1959 c g
 Mycomya portoblest Coher, 1959 c g
 Mycomya praeda Vaisanen, 1984 i c g
 Mycomya prominens (Lundstrom, 1913) c g
 Mycomya pseudoapicalis (Landrock, 1925) c g
 Mycomya pseudocurvata Vaisanen, 1979 c g
 Mycomya pseudopulchella (Ostroverkhova, 1979) c g
 Mycomya pseudoultima Zaitzev, 1994 c g
 Mycomya pulchella (Dziedzicki, 1885) c g
 Mycomya punctata (Meigen, 1804) c g
 Mycomya pura Vaisanen, 1984 i c g
 Mycomya pygmalion Vaisanen, 1984 c g
 Mycomya pyriformis Vaisanen, 1984 i c g
 Mycomya qingchengana Wu & Yang, 1995 c g
 Mycomya ratufa  g
 Mycomya rebellicosa Vaisanen, 1984 i c g
 Mycomya recondita (Ostroverkhova, 1979) c g
 Mycomya recurva Johannsen, 1910 i c g
 Mycomya recurvata Wu, 1995 c g
 Mycomya richmondensis (Skuse, 1890) c g
 Mycomya rivalis (Santos Abreu, 1920) c g
 Mycomya rosalba Hutson, 1979 c g
 Mycomya ruficollis Zetterstedt i c g
 Mycomya rufonigra Matile, 1991 c g
 Mycomya sachalinensis Zaitzev, 1994 c g
 Mycomya safena Vaisanen, 1984 i c g
 Mycomya saga Vaisanen, 1984 i c g
 Mycomya samesteri Coher, 1950 c g
 Mycomya schmidi Vaisanen, 1984 c g
 Mycomya scopula Fisher, 1937 i c g
 Mycomya setifera Freeman, 1951 c g
 Mycomya shannoni Coher, 1950 c g
 Mycomya shawi Coher, 1950 c g
 Mycomya shermani Garrett, 1924 i c g
 Mycomya shewelli Vaisanen, 1984 i c g
 Mycomya shimai  g
 Mycomya siebecki (Landrock, 1912) c g
 Mycomya sieberti (Landrock, 1930) c g
 Mycomya sigma Johannsen, 1910 i c g
 Mycomya simillima Freeman, 1951 c g
 Mycomya simpla Coher, 1959 c g
 Mycomya simplex (Coquillett, 1905) i c g
 Mycomya simulans Vaisanen, 1984 c g
 Mycomya sororcula (Zetterstedt, 1852) c g
 Mycomya sphagnicola Shaw, 1941 i c g
 Mycomya spinicoxa (Vaisanen, 1979) c g
 Mycomya spinifera Freeman, 1951 c g
 Mycomya spinosa Freeman, 1951 c g
 Mycomya stares Vaisanen, 1984 i c g
 Mycomya storai Vaisanen, 1979 c g
 Mycomya storåi Vaisanen, 1979 c g
 Mycomya strombuliforma Wu & Yang, 1993 c g
 Mycomya subarctica Vaisanen, 1979 i c g
 Mycomya subepacra Coher, 1959 c g
 Mycomya subfusca Freeman, 1951 c g
 Mycomya sublittoralis Shaw, 1941 i c g
 Mycomya sus Vaisanen, 1996 c g
 Mycomya sylvicola (Skuse, 1890) c g
 Mycomya tamerlani Vaisanen, 1984 c g
 Mycomya tantalos Coher, 1959 c g
 Mycomya tantilla (Loew, 1869) i c g
 Mycomya taurica (Strobl, 1898) c g
 Mycomya taurus Freeman, 1951 c g
 Mycomya tenuis (Walker, 1856) i c
 Mycomya terminata Garrett, 1924 i c g
 Mycomya theobaldi Coher, 1959 c g
 Mycomya thrakis Chandler, 2006 c g
 Mycomya thula Vaisanen, 1984 i c g
 Mycomya tigrina Vaisanen, 1996 c g
 Mycomya tolteca Vaisanen, 1984 c g
 Mycomya traveri Coher, 1950 c g
 Mycomya triacantha Shaw, 1941 i c g
 Mycomya tricamata Wu & Yang, 1996 c g
 Mycomya trichops Freeman, 1951 c g
 Mycomya tridens (Lundstrom, 1911) c g
 Mycomya trifida (Ostroverkhova, 1979) c g
 Mycomya trilineata (Zetterstedt, 1838) c g
 Mycomya trivittata (Zetterstedt, 1838) i c g
 Mycomya tumida (Winnertz, 1863) c g
 Mycomya tungusica (Ostroverkhova, 1979) c g
 Mycomya turnix Vaisanen, 1996 c g
 Mycomya ultima Vaisanen, 1984 i c g
 Mycomya unicolor (Walker, 1848) i c g
 Mycomya unipectinata Edwards, 1927 c g
 Mycomya univittata (Zetterstedt, 1838) c g
 Mycomya vaisaneni Wu & Yang, 1994 c g
 Mycomya vittiventris (Zetterstedt, 1852) c g
 Mycomya viverra Vaisanen, 1996 c g
 Mycomya wankowiczii Dzeidzicki i c g
 Mycomya winnertzi (Dziedzicki, 1885) i c g
 Mycomya wirthi Vaisanen, 1984 i c g
 Mycomya woodi Vaisanen, 1984 i c g
 Mycomya wrzesniowskii (Dziedzicki, 1885) c g
 Mycomya wuorentausi Vaisanen, 1984 c g
 Mycomya wuyishana Yang & Wu, 1993 c g
 Mycomya yatai  g
 Mycomya yoshimotoi Matile, 1991 c g
 Mycomya yunga Vaisanen, 1984 c g
 Mycomya zaitsevi Vaisanen, 1984 c g
 Mycomya zig Vaisanen, 1996 c g

Data sources: i = ITIS, c = Catalogue of Life, g = GBIF, b = Bugguide.net

References

Mycoma
Articles created by Qbugbot